4899 Candace, provisional designation , is a background asteroid from the inner regions of the asteroid belt, approximately 7 kilometers in diameter. It was discovered on 9 May 1988, by astronomer couple Carolyn and Eugene Shoemaker at the Palomar Observatory in California, United States. The asteroid was named after American chemist Candace Kohl.

Orbit and classification 

Candace is a non-family asteroid from the main belt's background population based on the hierarchical clustering method. It has also been considered a member of the Phocaea family. It orbits the Sun in the inner main-belt at a distance of 1.9–2.8 AU once every 3 years and 8 months (1,335 days; semi-major axis of 2.37 AU). Its orbit has an eccentricity of 0.19 and an inclination of 23° with respect to the ecliptic.

Physical characteristics 

Candace is an assumed stony S-type asteroid.

Rotation period 

In April 2010, a rotational lightcurve of Candace was obtained from photometric observations by Petr Pravec at Ondřejov Observatory. Lightcurve analysis gave a rotation period of 40.7 hours with a brightness amplitude of 0.15 magnitude.

Diameter and albedo 

According to the surveys carried out by the Japanese Akari satellite and the NEOWISE mission of NASA's Wide-field Infrared Survey Explorer, Candace measures between 6.205 and 8.56 kilometers in diameter and its surface has an albedo between 0.087 and 0.4213.

The Collaborative Asteroid Lightcurve Link assumes a standard albedo for stony members of the Phocaea family of 0.23 and calculates a diameter of 7.63 kilometers based on an absolute magnitude of 12.8.

Naming 

This minor planet was named after American chemist Candace P. Kohl, who has been investigating ancient solar activity through analysis of nuclides in lunar rocks. She has also contributed in the development of dating techniques of cosmic-ray-produced nuclides in Earth surface materials. She is known for her popular astronomy lectures. Citation provided by Kunihiko Nishiizumi (also see ) at the request of the discoverers. The approved naming citation was published by the Minor Planet Center on 12 July 1995.

Notes

References

External links 
 Asteroid Lightcurve Database (LCDB), query form (info )
 Dictionary of Minor Planet Names, Google books
 Asteroids and comets rotation curves, CdR – Observatoire de Genève, Raoul Behrend
 Discovery Circumstances: Numbered Minor Planets (1)-(5000) – Minor Planet Center
 
 

004899
Discoveries by Carolyn S. Shoemaker
Discoveries by Eugene Merle Shoemaker
Named minor planets
19880509